This is a list of airports in Mauritius, sorted by location.



Airports 

Airport names shown in bold indicate the airport has scheduled service on commercial airlines.

See also 
 Transport in Mauritius
 List of airports by ICAO code: F#FI – Mauritius
 Wikipedia: WikiProject Aviation/Airline destination lists: Africa#Mauritius

References 
 
  - includes IATA codes
 Great Circle Mapper: Airports in Mauritius - IATA and ICAO codes
 World Aero Data: Mauritius - ICAO codes and coordinates

Mauritius
 
Airports
Airports
Mauritius